Palm Beach Lakes Community High School, also known as Lakes or PBL, is a coeducational public high school located in the Palm Beach Lakes community of West Palm Beach, Florida.  It is under the jurisdiction of the School District of Palm Beach County.   The school has the Teacher's Academy Program and serves as the Law Magnet for the entire county.

Once having an enrollment of over 3,500, Palm Beach Lakes was once one of the largest schools in its district.  However, due to Florida's Class Size Amendment and the continuous building of high schools in the district, Palm Beach Lakes has a school enrollment of just over 3,000.  However, it still remains one of the largest high schools in South Florida.

History 

Palm Beach Lakes Community High School was established in 1989 after the closing of Twin Lakes High School (a merging of Palm Beach High School and Roosevelt High School) in downtown West Palm Beach.

Central School was the first school on "The Hill," built in 1908 to replace a four-room schoolhouse located a half-mile to the northeast, at Clematis Street and Dixie Highway. Parents at the time worried about sending their children so far out of town into the wilderness, and residents wondered if the town would ever grow into the school. It did. A new high school building — Palm Beach High School — opened there in 1915. A third building was added in 1922, and a fourth in 1927. In 1970 the school changed its name to Twin Lakes, which closed in June 1988. It briefly operated as Palm Beach Lakes High until that school's new campus opened in 1989.

Palm Beach High School served as the original site of Palm Beach Junior College, now Palm Beach State College. County school superintendent Joe Youngblood and Howell Watkins, the principal of Palm Beach High School who later became the college's first dean, were instrumental in opening the college. The college's initial goal was to provide additional training to local high school graduates who were unable to find jobs during the Great Depression. PBJC was founded in 1933 and is the oldest community college in the state of Florida.

At the start of the 1970–1971 school year, Palm Beach High School merged with Roosevelt High School forming Twin Lakes High School.  The latter, Roosevelt High, was established as the high school for African Americans in West Palm Beach.  They were athletic rivals with John F. Kennedy High School, the High School for African-Americans in Riviera Beach.  During integration, this school would go on to become part of Suncoast Community High School.  However, the school maintained its original location and became John F. Kennedy Jr. High School, later becoming a middle school serving grades 6–8. Roosevelt High was located at the site of the current Roosevelt Service Center, on the Northwest corner of Tamarind Avenue and L. A. Kirksey Street (15th Street).  This site would also become known as Roosevelt Junior High School in the 1960s.

The name of the new school was Twin Lakes High School, derived from the fact that the merging of the schools had integrated them, and also that the new school setting was diverse with differing groups of ethnicities merging into a future that was united. Logic suggests the school's new name referred to the adjoining lakes west of downtown: Lake Mangonia, near Roosevelt, and Clear Lake, near Palm Beach High. The site was located in Downtown West Palm Beach at the current Dreyfoos School of the Arts site. Palm Beach High School then ceased to exist, as did Roosevelt High School.

During the 1988–89 school year, another historical high school in West Palm Beach, North Shore High School (notable alumni include Derek Harper), merged with Twin Lakes High School. However, the name of this merger became Palm Beach Lakes High School. The site of the new Palm Beach Lakes High School, located at its current location at the intersection of Military Trail and 45th Street in West Palm Beach, was not completed until midway through the school year. Once completed midway through the school year, all of the Palm Beach Lakes High School students, faculty, and staff moved to their new campus.

The physical structure of Twin Lakes High School was closed and was due to be demolished once Palm Beach Lakes High School officially opened. It was only by heroic efforts by PBHS Alumni that the buildings were saved and subsequently repurposed as Dreyfoos School of the Arts. Similar efforts from North Shore High School's alumni helped save their old school from destruction. Today, Bak Middle School of the Arts is located on the former campus of North Shore High School.

Graduates of Palm Beach High School have never considered themselves to be anything but proud PBHS Wildcats and trophies and other memorabilia are now stored in a small museum in downtown West Palm Beach.

Sports 
The school's major sports rivals are Palm Beach Gardens Community High School, William T. Dwyer High School, and Suncoast Community High School.

 Baseball – Men 6A
 Basketball – Men and Women 6A (Varsity, Junior Varsity, and Freshman)
 Bowling – Men and Women
 Cheerleading – (Varsity, Junior Varsity, and Freshman)
 Football – 6A (Varsity, Junior Varsity, and Freshman)
 Flag Football – Women
 Golf – Men and Women
 Tennis – Men and Women
 Track and Field – Men and Women 4A
 Soccer – Men and Women (Varsity and Junior Varsity)
 Softball – Women 6A
 Swimming – Men and Women (Varsity)
 Volleyball – Men and Women (Varsity and Junior Varsity)
 Wrestling – Men and Women (Varsity, Junior Varsity, and Freshman)

Palm Beach Lakes holds an annual basketball tournament, known as the Derek Harper Holiday Tournament. It is named after the retired NBA guard Derek Harper,.  Teams from Palm Beach, Broward, and Miami-Dade counties participate in the tournament which draws thousands each year.  The event is held the week after Christmas for 4 days.

Notable alumni 
 Malcolm Knowles – Adult Education
 Fabrice Noël – Haitian international soccer player
 Dick Howser – former Major League Baseball player and manager; played for Kansas City A's 1961–63, Cleveland Indians 1963–66, New York Yankees 1967–68.  Major League Baseball manager; New York Yankees 1978, 1980, Kansas City Royals 1981–86.
 Vinny Sutherland – former NFL player
 Rice Brothers – Local businessmen; former holders of the world record for being the shortest living twins
 Scott Lusader – former Major League Baseball player; Detroit Tigers 1987–1990, New York Yankees 1991
 Jarrett Brown – Quarterback for the San Francisco 49ers
 John Michaels - Sports Talk Radio Host 680 the Fan Atlanta 
 Eddie Lovett – American hurdler
 Burt Reynolds – American Actor
 Ken Johnson - former Major League Baseball pitcher

References

External links 
 PBL website
 School District of Palm Beach County

Educational institutions established in 1989
High schools in Palm Beach County, Florida
Buildings and structures in West Palm Beach, Florida
Public high schools in Florida
1989 establishments in Florida